A time warp is an imaginary spatial distortion that allows time travel in fiction, or a hypothetical form of time dilation or contraction.

Time Warp may also refer to:

Music 
"Time Warp" (song), from The Rocky Horror Show 
Time Warp (album), a 1995 R&b/House album by Chick Corea
"Time Warp", an R&B track that appeared as a B-side on Eddy Grant's 1983 single "Electric Avenue"
"Timewarp", a single by Sub Focus

Entertainment 
Time Warp (TV series), a popular science television program
Time Warp (comics), a comic book series published by DC Comics in 1980 and 2013
Time Warp (festival), an electronic music festival
The Time Warp Trio, a children's book series
Time Warp Trio, animated series based on the book series

Technology 
Dynamic time warping, the property that the timing of a sequence of events may not be regular, addressed in computational sequence comparisons via a dynamic programming algorithm
Asynchronous reprojection, also called time warp, in virtual reality headsets

Other uses
Time Warp (roller coaster), a roller coaster at Canada's Wonderland